The Equator Monument is located on the equator in Pontianak, Indonesia. It marks the division between the northern and southern hemispheres.

History
First monument built in 1928 by a Dutch geographer.
1930 completed, in form of bollard radially and dart.
1938 rebuilt with completion by architect Friedrich Silaban. The original monument is still visible in the interior.
1990 renovated with the addition of a dome to protect the original monument and also making of duplicate of monument of the size five times bigger than its original size. 
 Its grand opening on September 21, 1991.

Construction
The monument consists of four ironwood poles, each with a diameter of about 0,30 metres, with frontage bollard height is two pieces as high as 3,05 radian place backside bollard and the signpost dart as high as 4,40 metres.

Location
Its location is in Jalan Khatulistiwa, literally translated into Equator Road, North Pontianak, about 3 kilometres from the city centre of Pontianak.

The equator monument is not on the equator any more. Land masses are affected by plate tectonics, and Earth's equator itself moves due to the precession of the equinoxes and nutation. The equator has moved slightly southwards and there is another line outside the monument, that shows the recorded position in 2005. The position of the equator in 2010 is even further south and now is in a river, as a GPS device can confirm.

Buildings and structures in Pontianak
Tourist attractions in West Kalimantan
Monuments and memorials in Indonesia
Buildings and structures completed in 1930
Equator monuments
1930 establishments in the Dutch East Indies